Manu Vunipola (born circa 1967 in Kolomotu'a,) is a Tongan former rugby union player and former Tonga sevens coach. He played as scrum-half. Currently he is the Minister of Sport of Tonga.

Career
Vunipola debuted for Tonga in the 1987 Rugby World Cup, playing only against Wales, in Palmerston North, on 29 May 1987. He also played the 1995 Rugby World Cup, playing the matches against France and against Scotland, in Pretoria. His last international cap was during the match against Fiji in Nuku'alofa, on 26 June 1999.

Personal life
He is brother of the fly-half Elisi Vunipola and of the hooker Feʻao Vunipola, both Tongan internationals. He is also the uncle of Feʻao's sons, Billy and Mako Vunipola, both England internationals.

Notes

External links

 

1967 births
Living people
Tongan rugby union players
Rugby union scrum-halves
Tonga international rugby union players
People from Nukuʻalofa